Adam Hemmeon (April 28, 1788 – July 9, 1867) was Mayor of the City of Halifax, Nova Scotia from 1848-1849.

Before becoming Mayor, Hemmeon was one of the founders of the Halifax Water Company, Halifax Regional Water Commission which took the first steps toward a safe and reliable water supply for the Halifax region.

References

Mayors of Halifax, Nova Scotia
1788 births
1867 deaths